The Scottish Amateur Football League (SAFL) is Scotland's oldest football league competition for amateur teams in Scotland. Although the League officially records itself as having been founded in 1909, when Scottish Football League club Queen's Park decided that their fourth team needed regular competition, research published by the Scottish Football Historical Archive confirms that the league was actually founded by six clubs at a meeting at Glasgow University in late June 1901, with Paisley Academicals winning the first championship. Queen's Park were successful in winning the league title in 1909-10, but Edinburgh Civil Service won the league the following year, so Queen's Park decided to enter their third team for the third season of the competition, indicating a high standard of football was played at this level from an early stage.

History

Despite being called the Scottish Amateur Football League, the league has never included clubs from across the country. Although, prior to the official formation of the league a SAFL side made at least one visit to Fife for a match. Prior to the Second World War membership stretched across the Scottish Central Belt, with a number of clubs from the East of the country participating. However, following the end of the war membership became concentrated in the West of the country. The SAFL has been successful in embracing a number of clubs from the Argyll area which otherwise might not have regular competition.

At its peak in the early 1980s the SAFL contained 12 divisions, but for season 2020/21 there will be 3. For more than 20 years, the League was split into a Premier section of three divisions, with two or three further divisions comprising Section One, so named as it preserved the divisions of the original league. But following an SAFA directive during the 2011–12 season, this format has been changed back to one all-in competition, with effect from the start of the 2012–13 season. The three premier divisions are retained, and the lowest two divisions become two sections of equal status, decided by a balloted draw prior to the start of each season. The top two teams from each section will be promoted to Premier 2, which will start the 2012–13 season with 11 clubs, but will have 12 clubs from the start of the following season.

Hall of fame
In March 2013, the League held its inaugural Hall of Fame Dinner, attended by well over 300 guests, at which the following became the first inductees to the SAFL Hall of Fame:

 Alan Bruce (Busby AFC)                      
 Alan & Russel Davidson (Whitehill FP AFC)
 Eamon Gowen (Nolt Gulch Town)
 Charlie Henderson (Paisley AFC)             
 Duncan McAulay (Campbeltown Pupils AFC)
 Keith Millar (Oban Saints)                  
 Derek Yuille (Rutherglen AFC)

Executive Members 2021-2022 

Office Bearers

Margaret McMillan – President  
Maiwill Hunman – Vice President
Raymond McMillan – Secretary 
Derek Milton – Match Secretary  
Robert Bowman – Minutes Secretary  
Campbell McPherson - Treasurer
Margaret McMillan – Discipline Secretary  
Stewart Cameron - Registration Secretary
 
Divisional Representatives

Frank McCann – Premier 
Danny Cameron - Premier 1

League Membership 2021-2022

Premier
Castlemilk BC
Easthall Star
Ffellomarghey
Glynhill Moorcroft
Hillington
Inverclyde
Kings Park Rangers
Neilston
Parkhall
Rutherglen
Port Glasgow Ams

Division 1 Championship

Arthurlie U21's
Baljaffray Ams
Busby
Cardross Ams
Carlton YM
Claremont
Duncanrig FP
Dunoon
Glenburn
Lochgilphead Red Star
Port Glasgow OBU
St.Convals
Tarbert

League winners

External links 
 The SAFL's Official Website

 Scottish Amateur League champions 1901-1909

Football leagues in Scotland
Amateur association football in Scotland
1901 establishments in Scotland
Sports leagues established in 1901